Thomas Earl Gardner (born February 8, 1985) is an American professional basketball player who played briefly in the National Basketball Association (NBA).

A 6'5" (1.96 m) guard, Gardner played three seasons of college basketball at the University of Missouri. He was named to the All-Big 12 Third Team in 2006 after averaging 19.7 points per game in 28 games. After college, he played professionally in Belgium.

Gardner made his NBA debut with the Chicago Bulls on November 15, 2007, scoring two points in five minutes against the Phoenix Suns. On November 20, in what would be his last game as a Bull, Gardner scored a career-high 14 points against Denver. He was waived on December 7, 2007 to make room for Demetris Nichols.

Gardner signed with the Atlanta Hawks in August 2008 after averaging 16.3 points per game in the Rocky Mountain Revue. In September 2009, he joined the Memphis Grizzlies but was waived on October 8, 2009.

On December 28, 2009, he returned to Belgium to sign with the Antwerp Giants.

NBA career statistics

Regular season 

|-
| align="left" | 2007–08
| align="left" | Chicago
| 4 || 0 || 11.3 || .391 || .250 || .000 || 1.0 || .3 || .0 || .0 || 5.3
|-
| align="left" | 2008–09
| align="left" | Atlanta
| 16 || 0 || 6.1 || .250 || .174 || .500 || .4 || .1 || .3 || .1 || 1.5
|-
| align="left" | Career
| align="left" | 
| 20 || 0 || 7.1 || .305 || .200 || .333 || .6 || .2 || .2 || .1 || 2.3

Playoffs 

|-
| align="left" | 2008–09
| align="left" | Atlanta
| 3 || 0 || 6.3 || .385 || .500 || 1.000 || .7 || .7 || .3 || .0 || 4.7
|-
| align="left" | Career
| align="left" | 
| 3 || 0 || 6.3 || .385 || .500 || 1.000 || .7 || .7 || .3 || .0 || 4.7

Notes

External links
NBA.com: Thomas Gardner Info Page
NBA Draft 2006 profile

1985 births
Living people
African-American basketball players
American expatriate basketball people in Belgium
American expatriate basketball people in Mexico
American expatriate basketball people in Russia
American men's basketball players
Atlanta Hawks players
Austin Toros players
Basketball players from Portland, Oregon
Chicago Bulls players
Jefferson High School (Portland, Oregon) alumni
Missouri Tigers men's basketball players
PBC Lokomotiv-Kuban players
Shooting guards
Toros de Nuevo Laredo players
Undrafted National Basketball Association players
21st-century African-American sportspeople
20th-century African-American people